Trichostema arizonicum, the Arizona bluecurls, is a perennial plant in the mint family (Lamiaceae) native to the Southwestern United States (Arizona, New Mexico, Texas) and northwestern Mexico. It has striking curling flowers and can often be found along road sides. The genus name means "hair stems" in reference to the graceful stamens that curl around to dab pollen on the backs of insect pollinators.

References

arizonicum
Flora of the Southwestern United States
Flora of the South-Central United States
Flora of Sonora
Flora of the Chihuahuan Desert
Flora of the Sonoran Deserts
Plants described in 1872
Flora without expected TNC conservation status